Ramsen or Ramsch is a traditional Bavarian plain-trick, card game for three to five players that is played with a 32-card German-suited pack and is suitable both for adults and for children. It is one of the Rams group of card games that are distinguished by allowing players to drop out if they think they will fail to win the required number of tricks. An unusual feature of Ramsen is the presence of four permanent trump cards that rank just below the Trump Sow (Ace). It should not be confused with the contract of Ramsch in games like Skat or Schafkopf, nor with the related game of Rams which is also called Ramsen in Austria, but is played with a Piquet pack, does not have permanent trumps and has a different card ranking.

History 
Ramsen appears to be over 200 years old, there being a reference to this "rural game" being played around 1800 in Bavaria. In an 1844 south German anthology, it is one of the card games that is "fun" and in which "one does not have to think too much". In 1877, the game is described as one of several which is "popular with ordinary folk" in Bavaria.

The earliest mention of a matador in any game of the Rams family is in 1862 when the Seven of Bells (Belle) is recorded as the highest card after the trump Deuce.

The village of Zaisertshofen has held 'world championships' in Ramsch, a variant of Ramsen, since at least 1990. There are usually two per year, at Christmas and Easter.

Ramsen is still taught and played in Bavaria today, for example, in Memmingen and Markt Rettenbach. It is also recorded as being played in the Austrian states of Vorarlberg, Tyrol, Lower Austria, Carinthia and Burgenland in recent times. It is described by Sirch as being suitable for adults and children alike.

Overview and aim 
Ramsen is one of the Rams family of card games, the distinguishing feature of which is that players may choose to drop out of the current game if they think they will be unable to win any tricks or a minimum number of tricks.

Ramsen is a plain-trick game in which the aim is to win as many tricks as possible and be the first to complete the two crosses used for scoring. It may also be played for small stakes.

Cards 
Ramsen is played with a 32-card, Bavarian pattern, German-suited pack with the suits of Acorns, Leaves or Grass, Hearts and Bells.

The ranking order of the cards within the plain suits is: Sow > King > Ober > Unter > 10 > 9 > 8 > 7. An unusual feature of Ramsen is the presence of four permanent trump cards that rank just below the Trump Sow:

 9 – the 9 of Bells or Dallmutz
 7 – the 7 of Bells  or Belli
 O – the Ober of Acorns or Großer Bube ("Big Boy" or "Big Jack")
  U – the Unter of Acorns or Kleiner Bube ("Little Boy" or "Little Jack").

Thus the ranking order of the trump suit (T = trump, A = Sow, etc.) is: TA > 9 > 7 > O > U > TK > TO > TU > T10 > T9 > T8 > T7.

Playing

Dealing and trumps 
The dealer shuffles the pack and rearhand cuts. Rearhand may keep (schleck, literally "lap up") the bottom card of the top stack, but will then only be dealt four cards. Otherwise players are dealt five cards as one packet of three and one packet of two. The next card is flipped to determine the trump suit and the remainder placed face down next to it as the talon.

Exchanging 
Each player, in clockwise order beginning with forehand, may now exchange cards from the hand for cards in the talon. In addition, the dealer may exchange with the trump upcard. A maximum of five cards may be exchanged in total. In other words, if forehand exchanges three, the next player may only exchange two. If he does so, no more exchanging may take place. If rearhand has schleckt when cutting the pack, he may not exchange.

Bidding 
Each player now reviews his cards and opts to "play" or "pass". If a player has exchanged, he must play. The reason a player may want to pass – and therefore not participate in the current deal – is that, if he takes no tricks, he is penalised by having to complete an additional cross (i.e. by taking an extra five tricks) in order to win the game.

Trick playing 
Forehand leads to the first trick or, if he has passed, players play in order of positional seniority, beginning with forehand. Players must follow suit (Farbzwang), must play a trump if unable to follow suit (Trumpfzwang) and, in doing either, must head the trick if possible (Stechzwang). If a player cannot follow suit or trump, he may throw in any card.

Scoring 

Before the game, two crosses (X X) are drawn for each player. For every trick won, a bar is drawn at the end of one of the arms of the crosses; for the fifth trick a bar is drawn horizontally across the middle of the cross (see diagram right). The first player to complete 2 crosses is the winner. If a player takes no tricks, he gets an extra cross to complete.

Zaisertshofen variant 
The village of Zaisertshofen in the Upper Swabian county of Unterallgäu hosts biannual 'world championships' in a variant of Ramsen called Ramsch (not to be confused with the games of Ramsch or Ramscheln). The key differences are:

 Cards
The four permanent trumps are not individually named, but are collectively called Criticals (Kritischer) or Greeks (Griechen). 
 Bidding
Bidding takes place before exchanging.
 Schlecking 
 Before the pack is cut, the dealer must ensure the bottom card is not a Critical; if the cutter discovers it is, the dealer incurs 2 penalty points (2 extra lines on the slate).
 After cutting, the cutter may schleck a Critical from the bottom of the pack. Any player may challenge this; if it is a Critical, the challenger gets a 2-point penalty and must play that game; if the challenge is successful, the cutter gets 2 penalty points. The cutter may schleck up to 5 cards in this way.
 In addition to exchanging with the trump upcard, the dealer may schleck a Critical from the top of the stock provided he shows it to the others. He may schleck further Criticals this way.
 Scoring
 For each player, 7 lines are chalked up on a slate and one is erased for each trick taken.
 A player who plays but takes no tricks 'goes Ramsch and adds 2 more penalty points (= lines) to his account.
 The game has a loser not a winner, the aim being to avoid being the last one 'out'. 
 When a player erases his last line, he 'goes out' but must announce this before touching his last trick, on penalty of losing the game. Saying "out" too soon costs 2 penalty points.
 The last player out is the loser and scores a penalty Bolle (blob) marked on the slate.

 Kritzen Kritzen or Kritzeln''' appears in older literature as the name of a card game. Staub & Tobler (1895) state that it is a "card game with 5 cards (apiece), similar to Ramsen." Stalder says it is "a game with cards in which you chalk a number of lines on the table and erase as many lines as you win tricks."

Notes

References

 Literature 
 _ (1862). "Rammes" in the Freiberger Biercomment. J.G. Engelhardt, Freiberg. Annex, pp. 19ff.
 
 
 Korn, Karl (1858). Adolph und Walburg: oder die Tannenmühle eine Erzählung aus dem Anfange dieses Jahrhunderts.Augsburg, Bavaria: Lampart.
 
 Sirch, Walter (2008). Vom Alten zum Zwanzger – Bayerische Kartenspiele für Kinder und Erwachsene – neu entdeckt.'' Bayerischer Trachtenverband, Traunstein.
 Stalder, Franz Joseph (1818). Versuch eines Schweizerischen Idiotikon, mit etymologischen Bemerkungen untermischt, Volume 2. Aarau: Heinrich Remigius Sauerländer.
 Staub, Friedrich and Ludwig Tobler (1895). Schweizerisches Idiotikon. Vol. 3. Frauenfeld: J. Huber.

External links 
 Rules of Ramsch (Ramsen) at www.zaisertshofen.de.

Austrian card games
Bavarian card games
German deck card games
Four-player card games
Multi-player card games
Rams group
Vorarlberg card games